Bellyache may refer to:

Abdominal pain
Bellyache bush, a flowering plant native to Mexico, South America and the Caribbean islands
 Bellyache, an informal term for a complaint
"Bellyache" (Echobelly song), 1993
"Bellyache" (Billie Eilish song), 2017